Lincuiqiao station is a station on Line 8 of the Beijing Subway. It is located in Beijing's Chaoyang District along the north-south Lincui Road just inside the North 5th Ring Road (middle section). It is located near the National Tennis Center and the Beijing National Speed Skating Oval.

History 

The station opened on 31 December 2011.

Station layout 
The station has an underground island platform.

Exits 
There are 4 exits, lettered A, C1, C2, and D. Exit C1 is accessible.

References

External links

Beijing Subway stations in Chaoyang District
Railway stations in China opened in 2011